Rath is a constituency of the Uttar Pradesh Legislative Assembly covering the city of Rath in the Hamirpur district of Uttar Pradesh, India.

Rath is one of five assembly constituencies in the Hamirpur Lok Sabha constituency. Since 2008, this assembly constituency is numbered 229 amongst 403 constituencies.

Members of Legislative Assembly
1977: Bal Krishna, Janata Party
1980: Swami Prasad Singh, Indian National Congress (Indira)
1985: Doonger Singh, Indian National Congress
1987: Ram Singh, Indian National Congress (By Poll)
1989: Rajender Singh, Janata Dal
1991: Ram Singh, Indian National Congress
1993: Dhooram Lodhi, Bahujan Samaj Party
1996: Ramadhar Singh, Samajwadi Party
2002: Dhooram Lodhi, Bahujan Samaj Party
2007: Dhooram Lodhi, Bahujan Samaj Party
2012: Gayadeen Anuragi, Indian National Congress
2017: Manisha Anuragi, Bharatiya Janata Party

Election results

References

External links
 

Assembly constituencies of Uttar Pradesh
Hamirpur district, Uttar Pradesh